Groveton High School is a public high school located in the city of Groveton, Texas, USA, and classified as a 2A school by the University Interscholastic League. It is a part of the Groveton Independent School District located in central Trinity County. In 2015, the school was rated "Met Standard" by the Texas Education Agency.

Athletics
The Groveton Indians compete in volleyball, cross country, American football, basketball, track, baseball and softball.

State titles
American football –
1984 (2A), 1989 (2A), 1990 (2A)

State finalist
American football – 
1983 (2A), 1985 (2A), 1997 (2A)

Notable alumni
Rodney Dejuane Thomas (March 30, 1973 – June 14, 2014) was a professional American football player who played running back for seven seasons for the Houston Oilers/Tennessee Titans, and Atlanta Falcons
Lane Johnson (May 8, 1990) is a professional American football player with the Philadelphia Eagles.
Joe Jackson, American football player
Cody Johnson- Texas Country Music Artist

References

External links
Groveton ISD website

Public high schools in Texas
Schools in Trinity County, Texas